Anja Noske (born 10 June 1986) is a German rower.  Twice world champion in the women's lightweight quadruple sculls, she competed in the women's lightweight double sculls at the 2012 Summer Olympics with Lena Müller.

References

External links 
 
 
 

1986 births
Living people
People from Lüneburg
Rowers at the 2012 Summer Olympics
Olympic rowers of Germany
German female rowers
World Rowing Championships medalists for Germany
European Rowing Championships medalists
Sportspeople from Lower Saxony